Manish Tewari (born 8 December 1965) is a Prominent Indian lawyer and politician. He is a member of the Indian National Congress and represents Anandpur Sahib in the 17th Lok Sabha. He was the Minister of Information and Broadcasting from 2012 to 2014 and a Member of Parliament from Ludhiana from 2009 to 2014.

Personal life
Manish Tewari was born on 8 December 1965 Ludhiana, Punjab to V.N. Tiwari, an author of Punjabi language and professor at the Panjab University; and Amrit Tewari was a dentist who worked as Professor and Head, Oral Health Sciences Center, and Dean at Post Graduate Institute of Medical Education and Research. His father was killed by militants in 1984 at Sector 24, Chandigarh during a morning walk, a few months before Operation Blue Star. His mother died in 2018 following a cardiac arrest. Tewari's maternal grandfather, Sardar Tirath Singh was a lawyer and a minister in Congress' government in the state of Punjab.

Tewari attained a Bachelor's of Arts degree from Panjab University, Chandigarh and later a Bachelor of Laws from the University of Delhi. During his time at the Panjab University, he led the sports teams in swimming and water polo. Tewari married Naznin Shifa, a Parsi in March 1996 and now resides in Lodhi Gardens, New Delhi. The couple has a daughter, Ineka Tewari.

Career

Tewari was the president of National Students Union of India from 1988 to 1993 and Indian Youth Congress(I) from 1998 to 2000. He lost the 2004 Lok sabha elections but successfully contested the 2009 Lok Sabha elections by defeating Shiromani Akali Dal's candidate Gurcharan Singh Galib by a margin of over 100,000 votes. He was Union Minister for Information and Broadcasting. Tewari, an advocate by profession, presently practices in the Supreme Court of India and the High Courts of Delhi as well as Punjab and Haryana.

As a member of parliament he has been active in drafting a Private member's Bill to bring the intelligence agencies under parliamentary oversight. While he was scheduled to contest polls from his constituency Ludhiana, in March 2014 he was admitted to hospital for heart ailment. Days later he expressed his unwillingness to contest parliamentary elections owing to his ill health. He has been replaced by Ravneet Singh Bittu, the grandson of former Punjab Chief Minister Beant Singh.

Manish Tewari was a speaker at Bridge India's webinar on "India's foreign policy: Taking stock at the end of Year One" In 2022, it was reported that Tewari may be a candidate in the 2022 Indian National Congress presidential election.

References

External links
 www.manishtewari.info 
 
 HT Leadership Summit Discussion featuring Manish Tewari and Mahua Moitra

Indian Youth Congress Presidents
India MPs 2009–2014
Living people
Indian National Congress politicians
People from Punjab, India
Lok Sabha members from Punjab, India
Union ministers of state of India with independent charge
Ministers for Information and Broadcasting of India
1965 births
People from Ludhiana district
India MPs 2019–present